Thorsten Görke (born 22 September 1976) is a German former footballer.

References

External links

1976 births
Living people
German footballers
Association football midfielders
1. FC Lokomotive Leipzig players
FC Erzgebirge Aue players
FC Carl Zeiss Jena players
Chemnitzer FC players
FC Rot-Weiß Erfurt players
Hallescher FC players
2. Bundesliga players